Tim Malchak (born June 25, 1957, in Binghamton, New York) is an American country music singer-songwriter. Malchak partnered with Dwight Rucker in 1982 to form the country music duo Malchak & Rucker. Together, they became the first black/white duo in country music history with a charting single when "Just Like That" debuted on the Billboard Hot Country Singles & Tracks chart in 1984.

When the duo disbanded in 1986, Malchak launched a solo career. Alpine Records released his debut album, Colorado Moon, in 1987 and its title track became his first Top 40 single. His second Top 40 single, the self-penned, "Restless Angel" followed as part of his next album, American Man; I t was released in 1988. The album's second single, "It Goes Without Saying," was his highest charting single on the Billboard Hot Country Singles & Tracks chart, peaking at No. 35. Malchak then signed with Jimmy Bowen's Universal Records for the release of his third album, Different Circles.

After the album failed to produce any Top 40 singles, Malchak moved to South Carolina in 1992. In 2001, he released his first Christian album, Pathway to Glory, on his own Parable Records. Later that year, he launched Tim Malchak Ministries. As of 2017, Malchak has released twelve Christian albums. Currently, he and his wife, Leslie, tour the Southeastern United States with their traveling music ministry.

Discography

Albums

2020
“One Nation Under God”

2021
“Renewed”

2022
"God Knows"

Singles

Music videos

References

External links

Tim Malchak Ministries
[ Tim Malchak] at Allmusic

1957 births
American country singer-songwriters
American male singer-songwriters
Living people